The Port Jackson Painter was one or more unknown watercolour artists working in Sydney, Australia, from 1788 through to the 1790s. The paintings are of plants, animals and life in Sydney. Many believe that they were the naval officers of the time who had both the time and the training to paint the new environment around them.

References

External links
First Fleet artwork collection

19th-century Australian artists
People from Sydney
18th century in Australia
18th-century Australian artists